The Green Archer is a ten part 1925 American mystery film serial directed by Spencer Gordon Bennet. It is based on Edgar Wallace's bestselling 1923 novel of the same name. The filmmakers moved the setting of the novel from England to the United States. The story was remade in the sound era as another serial The Green Archer by Columbia Pictures.

The first episode is titled "The Ghost of Bellamy Castle" (released in the U.S. December 6, 1925), and the final one is "The Smoke Clears Away" (released in the U.S. February 27, 1926).  The serial was released in the United Kingdom by Pathé Pictures International beginning on October 4, 1926.

Cinematographer Stanley Cortez had one of his earliest jobs as assistant cameraman on the serial. Actress Allene Ray went on to star in a number of other serials such as The Terrible People (1928), Hawk of the Hills (1929) and The Indians Are Coming (1930). Director Bennett also went on to direct many sound serials over the next several decades.

The poster had the tagline "The foreboding shadow of the grim Archer - the twang of the bow - and green feathered Death speeds to its mark!"

Most of the books of Edgar Wallace have been adapted into films many times over the years in both England in the 1930s, and in Germany in the 1960s in a series known as the crimis (see Films based on works by Edgar Wallace).

Plot
As described in a film magazine review, a young woman who believes Abel Bellamy, a recluse millionaire, has kidnaped and for eighteen years has held prisoner another young woman, tries to prove her suspicion by searching the grounds of a medieval castle on the millionaire’s estate. The mansion had been moved stone by stone from its original location in England to the United States. Her quest leads her into numerous hazardous adventures and into a romance with a young officer of the state troops. During the hunt several persons are killed by a mysterious archer, whose identity is not learned until the millionaire’s castle is finally besieged. The young woman’s romance leads to her marriage with the troop officer.

Cast

Preservation
The film no longer exists in complete form. Only the third, fourth and fifth chapters still exist of the original ten-part serial, preserved in the UCLA Film and Television Archive.

Chapter titles

 The Ghost of Bellamy Castle
 The Midnight Warning
 In the Enemy’s Stronghold
 On the Storm King Road
 The Affair at the River
 The Mystery Ship
 Bellamy Baits a Trap
 The Cottage in the Woods
 The Battle Starts
 The Smoke Clears Away

See also
 List of film serials
 List of film serials by studio
 The Green Archer (1961)

References

External links

1925 films
1925 mystery films
American silent serial films
American mystery films
American black-and-white films
Films based on works by Edgar Wallace
Films directed by Spencer Gordon Bennet
1920s American films
Silent mystery films
1920s English-language films